Into the Unknown may refer to:

Music 
 Into the Unknown (Bad Religion album), 1983
 Into the Unknown (Mercyful Fate album), 1996
 "Into the Unknown" (song), a 2019 song by Idina Menzel and Aurora from the Frozen II soundtrack

TV and film 
 "Into the Unknown" (Star Wars Resistance episode), 2019
 Into the Unknown: Making Frozen II, a 2020 documentary about the Disney film Frozen II (2019)
 Into the Unknown (TV series), a non-fiction series

Dungeons and Dragons 
 Into the Unknown: The Dungeon Survival Handbook, a D&D sourcebook